Kiraoli is a town and a nagar panchayat in Agra district in the Indian state of Uttar Pradesh.

Geography
It has an average elevation of 168 metres (551 feet).
Kiraoli is on NH11 i.e. Agra Jaipur Highway. It also has railway station on Agra-Kota-Mumbai railway track. Kiraoli is a small town in between two most important historic places of mugal period, those are Agra (23 km) and Fatehpur Sikri (13 km).

Demographics
As of 2011 Indian Census, Kiraoli had a total population of 23,788, of which 12,634 were males and 11,154 were females. Population within the age group of 0 to 6 years was 4,066. The total number of literates in Kiraoli was 12,903	, which constituted 54.2% of the population with male literacy of 62.4% and female literacy of 45.0%. The effective literacy rate of 7+ population of Kiraoli was 65.4%, of which male literacy rate was 75.3% and female literacy rate was 54.2%. The Scheduled Castes and Scheduled Tribes population was 4,234 and 98 respectively. Kiraoli had 3423 households in 2011.

 India census, Kiraoli had a population of 18,921. Males constitute 53% of the population and females 47%. Kiraoli has an average literacy rate of 49%, lower than the national average of 59.5%: male literacy is 59%, and female literacy is 38%. In Kiraoli, 20% of the population is under 6 years of age.

References

Cities and towns in Agra district